Costas Costa (born January 4, 1969) is a former international Cypriot football midfielder.

Club career
He spent most of his playing career at APOEL, where he stayed for 9 years and won 3 Championships, 4 Cups and 4 Super Cups.1 double winning season 95-96

Later on, he played for FC Utrecht, Apollon Limassol and Olympiakos Nicosia.

He also had a trial with Newcastle United of England in 1993 and scored a goal from just over the halfway line against Annfield Plain of the Wearside Football League.

International career
Costas Costas had also been an important member of the Cyprus national football team, having 34 appearances and scoring 2 goals.

References

External links
 

1969 births
Living people
APOEL FC players
FC Utrecht players
Apollon Limassol FC players
Olympiakos Nicosia players
Cypriot footballers
Cyprus international footballers
Greek Cypriot people
Association football midfielders
Cypriot expatriate footballers
Expatriate footballers in the Netherlands
Cypriot expatriate sportspeople in the Netherlands
Eredivisie players
Sportspeople from Nicosia